Tazeh Kand-e Nahand (also Romanized as Tāzeh Kand-e Nahand and Tāzeh Kand Nahand; also known as Tazakend and  Tāzeh Kand) is a village in Mavazekhan-e Sharqi Rural District, Khvajeh District, Heris County, East Azerbaijan Province, Iran. At the 2006 census, its population was 278, in 74 families.

References 

Populated places in Heris County